Andrei Alekseyevich Filimonov (born 19 January 1985) is a former Russian professional football player.

Club career
He made his debut for FC Torpedo Moscow on 20 August 2003 in the Russian Premier League Cup semifinal against FC Zenit Saint Petersburg. He also appeared in the return leg against Zenit two weeks later.

External links
 

1985 births
Footballers from Moscow
Living people
Russian footballers
Association football midfielders
FC Torpedo Moscow players
FC Spartak Vladikavkaz players